The 2019 Davis Cup was the 108th edition of the Davis Cup, a tournament between national teams in men's tennis. It was sponsored by Rakuten.

For this edition, the format of the cup was changed. The main modification is the World Group took place at one location and in one week, with eighteen teams divided in six round-robin groups of three teams each, with the winners of the groups and the two best second places advancing to quarterfinals. The series between the teams in this stage featured two singles matches and one doubles match, instead of the best-of-5 series, with the matches changing from best of 5 sets to best of 3. As the World Group was taking place as one single tournament, this event had been named the 2019 Davis Cup Finals. The lower zone groups I and II were composed of single ties deciding promotion or relegation.

Spain won their sixth title (their first since 2011), defeating Canada in the final 2–0. Rafael Nadal received the Most Valuable Player (MVP) award for his performance in the tournament, after he won 8 of the 8 matches he participated in.

Davis Cup Finals

Date: 18–24 November 2019 
Venue: Caja Mágica in Madrid, Spain 
Surface: Hard court

18 nations are taking in the finals, formerly known as World Group. The qualification is as follows:
 4 semifinalists of the previous edition
 2 wild card teams
 12 winners of a qualifier round, in February 2019

H = Host Nation, TH = Title-Holder, 2018SF = Semi-Finalists from the 2018 tournament, WC = Wild Card

Seeds 
The seedings are based on the Nations Ranking of 4 February.

Qualifying round 

Date: 1–2 February 2019

Twenty-four teams played for twelve spots in the Finals, in series decided on a home and away basis.

These twenty-four teams are:
 4 losing quarterfinalists of the previous edition,
 8 winners of World Group play-offs of previous edition, and
 12 best teams not previously qualified with best ranking of their zone: 
 6 from Europe/Africa,
 3 from Asia/Oceania, and
 3 from Americas.

The 12 losing teams from the qualifying round then played at the Group I of the corresponding continental zone in September.

#: Nations Ranking as of 29 October 2018. 

Seeded teams
  (2018 Quarterfinalist, #4)
  (2018 play-off winner, #8)
  (best ranked for replacing wild cards, #9)
  (2018 Quarterfinalist, #10)
  (2018 Quarterfinalist, #11)
  (2nd best ranked for replacing wild cards, #12)
  (2018 Quarterfinalist, #13)
  (2018 play-off winner, #14)
  (2018 play-off winner, #15)
  (2018 play-off winner, #16)
  (2018 play-off winner, #17)
  (2018 play-off winner, #18)

Unseeded teams
  (Europe/Africa's best ranked, #21)
  (Europe/Africa's 2nd best ranked, #22)
  (Europe/Africa's 3rd best ranked, #23)
  (Europe/Africa's 4th best ranked, #26)
  (Europe/Africa's 5th best ranked, #27)
  (Europe/Africa's 6th best ranked, #29)
  (Asia/Oceania's best ranked, #20)
  (Asia/Oceania's 2nd best ranked, #24)
  (Asia/Oceania's 3rd best ranked, #30)
  (Americas' best ranked, #19)
  (Americas' 2nd best ranked, #25)
  (Americas' 3rd best ranked, #28)

Group stage 

T = Ties, M = Matches, S = Sets

Knockout stage

Final

Americas Zone

Group I 

Dates: 13–14 September and 14–15 September 2019

The losers go on and participate to the 2020 Davis Cup World Group I play-offs while the winners qualify to the 2020 Davis Cup World Group I

<onlyinclude>

Seeds: 

Remaining nations:

1Because of the Venezuelan financial crisis, the Venezuelan national team plays its "home" matches in the Miami metropolitan area in the United States.

Group II 

Dates: 5–6 April, 13–14 September and 14–15 September 2019

The losers go on and participate to the 2020 Davis Cup World Group II play-offs while the winners qualify to the 2020 Davis Cup World Group I play-offs

<onlyinclude>

Seeds: 

Remaining nations:

Group III 

Dates: 17–22 June 2019

Location: Costa Rica Country Club, Escazú, Costa Rica (hard)

The first three nations qualify for the 2020 Davis Cup World Group II play-offs

Participating nations

Pool A

 (host)

Pool B

Play-offs 

 ,  and  qualified to the 2020 Davis Cup World Group II play-offs

Asia/Oceania Zone

Group I 

Dates: 13–14 September, 14–15 September 2019 and 29–30 November 2019

The losers go on and participate to the 2020 Davis Cup World Group I play-offs while the winners qualify to the 2020 Davis Cup World Group I

<onlyinclude>

Seeds: 

Remaining nations:

Group II 

Dates: 5–6 April and 14–15 September 2019

The losers go on and participate to the 2020 Davis Cup World Group II play-offs while the winners qualify to the 2020 Davis Cup World Group I play-offs

<onlyinclude>

Seeds: 

Remaining nations:

Group III 

Dates: 26–29 June 2019

Location: Singapore Sports Hub, Singapore (indoor hard)

The first three nations qualify for the 2020 Davis Cup World Group II play-offs

The last nation is relegated to 2021 Davis Cup Asia/Oceania Zone Group IV
Participating nations

Pool A

 (host)

Pool B

Play-offs 

 ,  and  qualified to the 2020 Davis Cup World Group II play-offs

  relegated to 2021 Davis Cup Asia/Oceania Zone Group IV

Group IV 

Dates: 11–14 September 2019

Location: Jordan Tennis Federation, Amman, Jordan (hard)

The first two nations qualify for the 2021 Davis Cup Asia/Oceania Zone Group III

Participating nations

Pool A
 
  Pacific Oceania
 

Pool B
 
 
 

Pool C
 
  (host)
 
 

Pool D

Play-offs 

Europe/Africa Zone

Group I 

Dates: 13–14 September and 14–15 September 2019

The losers go on and participate to the 2020 Davis Cup World Group I play-offs while the winners qualify to the 2020 Davis Cup World Group I

<onlyinclude>

Seeds: 

Remaining nations:

Group II 

Dates: 5–6 April and 13–14 September 2019

The losers go on and participate to the 2020 Davis Cup World Group II play-offs while the winners qualify to the 2020 Davis Cup World Group I play-offs

<onlyinclude>

Seeds: 

Remaining nations:

Group III Europe 

Dates: 11–14 September 2019

Location: Tatoi Club, Athens, Greece (clay)

The first four nations qualify for the 2020 Davis Cup World Group II play-offs

The last two nations are relegated to 2021 Davis Cup Europe Zone Group IV

Participating nations

Pool A
  (host)
 
 
 

Pool B

Play-offs 

  and  relegated to 2021 Davis Cup Europe Zone Group IV

Group III Africa

Dates: 11–14 September 2019

Location: Nairobi Club Ground, Nairobi, Kenya (clay)

The first two nations qualify for the 2020 Davis Cup World Group II play-offs

The last two nations are relegated to 2021 Davis Cup Africa Zone Group IV

Participating nations

Pool A
 
 
 
 

Pool B
 
 
  (host)

Play-offs 

  and  qualified to the 2020 Davis Cup World Group II play-offs.

  and  relegated to 2021 Davis Cup Africa Zone Group IV

Group IV Europe 

Dates: 15–20 July 2019

Location: Centro Tennis Cassa di Risparmio, San Marino, San Marino (clay)

The first five nations qualify for the 2021 Davis Cup Europe Zone Group III
Participating nations

Pool A
 
 
 
 
 

Pool B
 
 
 
 
  (host)

Play-offs 

Group IV Africa

Dates: 26–29 June 2019

Location: Kintélé Sports Complex, Brazzaville, Republic of Congo (hard)

The first two nations qualify for the 2021 Davis Cup Africa Zone Group III
Participating nations

Pool A
 
 
 

Pool B
 
  (host)

Play-offs 

References

External links
Official website
Davis Cup 2019 Live Stream Info 

 
Davis Cup
Davis Cups by year